The Colorado Predators were an American soccer team, founded in 2007.

The indoor team was a member of the Premier Arena Soccer League (PASL), the development league for the Professional Arena Soccer League  (PASL-Pro), and played in the Rocky Mountain Conference against teams from Albuquerque NM, Rio Rancho NM, Colorado Springs CO, Windsor CO, Golden CO, and Fort Collins CO. In the Winter 2007/2008 season the Predators finished in 1st place in their conference. In the Summer 2008 season, the Predators again ended the season in 1st place in the Rocky Mountain Conference.

The Predators also had an outdoor team which, in 2008, was a provisional member of the National Premier Soccer League (NPSL) the fourth tier of the American Soccer Pyramid.

They played their home matches at the Parker Fieldhouse in the city of Parker, Colorado. The indoor team's colors were red, black, white and gold.

Indoor Team

Winter 2007 PASL Roster

Summer 2008 PASL Roster

Year-by-year

Playoff Record

References

External links
 Colorado Predators Web Site
 Colorado Predators Official Fan Page

National Premier Soccer League teams
Premier Arena Soccer League teams
P
Indoor soccer clubs in the United States
2007 establishments in Colorado